This is a list of notable traditional singers from Ireland. Some of the singers alphabetically listed below are known to have sung in both the Irish and English language and if so are listed in both sections below as well known singers of macaronic Irish songs.

Singers (by language)

Mainly English-language songs

Men
Paddy Berry, a CCÉ singer
Eddie Butcher of Magilligan, County Londonderry, singer, song collector and songwriter
Robert Cinnamond of Antrim, singer and song collector
Len Graham, married to Pádraigín Ní Uallacháin, with whom he has recorded numerous albums
Con Greaney, from Limerick
Frank Harte, seminal collector and singer in the English language tradition
Joe Holmes
Luke Kelly, from Dublin, best known for co-founding The Dubliners
Ronnie Drew, another founding member of The Dubliners
John Reilly
Paddy Tunney
Liam Weldon
Tom Lenihan, Irish sean-nós singer
Tommy Makem, The Bard of Armagh; sung multiple of his traditional Irish songs with the Clancy Brothers

Women
Margaret Barry, Irish Traveller from Cork, came to prominence in London after starting as a street singer
Karan Casey from Waterford, formerly a singer with Solas
Elizabeth "Bess" Cronin
Cara Dillon from Dungiven, singer and arranger of traditional songs
Rita Connolly from Co. Dublin, known for her work with Irish composer, Shaun Davey
Rosie Stewart Co. Fermanagh
Sarah Makem, source singer from Armagh
Sarah Anne O'Neill from Co. Tyrone, sister of Geordie Hanna
Caitríona O'Leary
Niamh Parsons from Dublin, formerly singer with Arcady
Róisín White from Co. Down, singer from Ireland who has passed-on songs to Clannad, Mairéad Ní Mhaonaigh, and Altan

Mainly Irish-language songs

Men

Women

See also
 Lilting, a traditional singing mode; sometimes called "mouth music"
 Traditional Irish singing
Celtic music

References

 
Singers, traditional
Irish, trad